Mirage I (formerly Magic I, Seminole Empress, Crucero Express, Jupiter, Bolero, Scandinavica and built as Bolero) was a cruiseferry built in 1973 in France for Fred.

During 2003 the ship operated as Ocean Club Cruises from Port Canaveral with 2-night cruises to Grand Bahama and 3-night cruises to Key West and Grand Bahama. In March 2004, it was bought by "Magic 1 Cruise Line Corp", a wholly owned subsidiary of Isramco, Inc. (Nasdaq: ISRL). It operated from the Port of Ashdod as "Magic 1" until 2010.

See also
  - sister ship

External links

 Ship history
 Professional photographs from shipspotting.com

References

Cruiseferries
1972 ships